Calvin John Robinson (born 29 October 1985) is a British conservative political commentator, writer, and broadcaster. Since 2022, he has also been a deacon in the Free Church of England (FCE). He is a regular contributor to The Daily Telegraph, the Daily Mail, Spiked, and First Things.
Robinson also features as a commentator on talkRADIO and presents a regular show on GB News.

Previously, Robinson had worked as a computer science teacher in a secondary school and as a video games journalist.

Early life and education
Robinson is of mixed-race heritage. His paternal grandparents emigrated from Jamaica as members of the Windrush generation. He was born and grew up in Mansfield, Nottinghamshire, England, attending High Oakham Primary School, The Brunts Academy, and later West Nottinghamshire College. He then studied at the University of Westminster where he graduated with a degree in computer games design and programming.

Career

Educational career
Robinson was employed in the technology industry before training as a teacher. He taught computer science at the St Mary's and St John's Church of England School in Hendon where he became head of the IT department, and later an assistant principal. In 2017, Robinson was featured in a recruitment advert encouraging people to become teachers. He was a video games journalist and is also owner of the video games site God is a Geek.

Between 2019 and 2021, he was a school governor and trustee at the Michaela School in Wembley. In 2020, he was appointed to the Education Sub-committee of the Board of the Royal Academy of Dance. He also became a senior fellow responsible for education policy at the conservative think tank Policy Exchange, but no longer held this position by 2023.

Political career
In 2016, Robinson contested the Kilburn ward of Brent Council in by-election as the Conservative Party candidate. He was defeated by the Labour candidate. In the 2018 he stood for election to Camden Council in the council's Swiss Cottage ward. He was again defeated by Labour candidates. 

Robinson stood in the 2019 general election as the Brexit Party candidate for Broxtowe, but withdrew his candidacy to support the Conservative candidate.

Robinson has also held various positions in right-wing political organisations and campaigns including Defund the BBC, Unite2Leave (a pro-Brexit tactical voting campaign), and Conservative Way Forward. He has contributed to Black Lives Matter UK: An Anthology, a Henry Jackson Society report opposing Black Lives Matter and "hard-left identity politics". Robinson has claimed that his commentary has made him the target of racial abuse.

Media career

Robinson has also worked for talkRADIO and as a television presenter on GB News, with, from late 2022, a regular slot on Sunday afternoons entitled "Calvin's Common Sense Crusade".

Ordained ministry
Robinson undertook a two year course of theological studies at St Stephen's House, Oxford from 2020 to 2022, with the hope of being ordained deacon in the Church of England. However, he failed to be appointed to a curacy within the Diocese of London and so was not ordained deacon in the Church of England.  

Robinson subsequently submitted a subject access request to the Church to understand the decision. This revealed email conversations between Jonathan Baker, the Bishop of Fulham, and Rob Wickham, the Bishop of Edmonton, raising concerns about Robinson's "libertarian anti-woke, anti-identity politics, Covid-skeptical" political views and his use of social media, particularly Twitter, to disseminate them. The Diocese of London later issued a statement highlighting the "limited number of curacies available", emphasised that vacancies were carefully "considered on a case-by-case basis" and that "in this instance, it is felt that there is no suitable" curacy available that the diocese could offer.

The decision to deny ordination to Robinson attracted criticism from conservative elements of the media, and within the Church, notably Angela Tilby, the canon emerita of Christ Church Cathedral, Oxford. Robinson described it as a "very narrow minded" decision that was a result of his “anti-woke” views and criticism of “bleeding-heart liberal vicars”.

Robinson left the Church of England for the Free Church of England where he was ordained as a deacon on 25 June 2022 by Bishop Paul Hunt, and appointed Minister-in-Charge at Christ Church, Harlesden. The Free Church of England is a member the Global Fellowship of Confessing Anglicans network of conservative episcopal churches.

Views

Political views 
Robinson opposes the teaching of critical race theory in British education and argues that the teaching of black history and lessons concerning black people should be taught within the context of British history and not taught separately. He has also defended colonialism and the British Empire, and has opposed reparations for slavery.

In July 2021, Robinson appeared in an interview on Channel 4 News with the singer and left-wing political activist Billy Bragg on the decision of England's football team players to "take the knee" in a protest against racism. He said the action was "disgusting" and argued that, in taking the knee, the team was promoting "Black Lives Matter", which he described as "a neo-Marxist, anti-British, anti-family organisation".

Robinson is a eurosceptic, having stood previously for election as a candidate for the Brexit Party, now Reform UK.

Theological and moral views 
In an interview with Premier Christianity, Robinson described himself as an Evangelical Catholic.
The Catholic Herald described Robinson as an Evangelical Anglican, but also noted that he shares some high church positions, such as the use of the title "Father", holding a "high" understanding of the Eucharist and of the institution of the church by Christ. According to the Catholic Herald, Robinson considers Michael Nazir-Ali, a former bishop of the Church of England who later converted to the Catholic Church to be a mentor.

He has spoken in favour of disestablishing the Church of England in order to free it from political influence and allow alternative Anglican churches to thrive. Robinson himself is a deacon in the Free Church of England, a conservative Anglican splinter group. Robinson is strongly critical of the leadership of the Church of England, accusing it of liberal political bias. Following his failure to obtain a Church of England curacy, Robinson alleged in The Mail on Sunday that Sarah Mullally, the Bishop of London, had personally told him off because of his rejection of critical race theory. 

Robinson opposes the ordination of women. He is also opposed to the facilitation of same-sex marriage in the Church of England and has argued that the Bible only allows marriage between a man and a woman. He argues that premarital sex is a sin. He also opposes abortion and holds pro-life positions.

References

External links
  (archived)

British Anglicans
British political commentators
British political writers
Living people
People from Mansfield
Black British writers
GB News newsreaders and journalists
Alumni of St Stephen's House, Oxford
1985 births
Evangelical Anglican clergy